Bryansk Automobile Plant (BAZ) is a Russian manufacturer of military vehicles based in Bryansk, Russia.

It was established in 1958 as a subsidiary of ZiL. It is one of the leading Russian military equipment manufacturers. It also produces off-road tractors and chassis with carrying capacity from 14 to 40 tons.

Since 2015 it is part of the Almaz-Antey holding.

History
Bryansk Automobile Plant was founded 4 June 1958 [1] as a branch of the Moscow factory ZIL for the manufacture of components: driving axles, barrels, boxes handout, suspension and other components for automobiles ZIL-131. The basis for the creation of new business was the manufacture tractor Bizhytskoho steel plant [1]. Already in 1959 from Moscow factory was moved production of vehicles for the army, and in 1960 on the base created a special closed design bureau and independent production. In 1961 the first development of the plant, BAZ-930, was tested, but the series did not go, and instead plant began production modifications Moscow ZIL-135L: ZIL-135LM, with manual transmission, processed BAZ-135MB and BAZ-135MBK. These machines differ typical four-axis location - average close together, front and rear spaced and managed.

In the mid-1960s in the BC plant was begun designing triaxial floating chassis with four-wheel drive. The paper used backlogs and design principles taken from ZIL, such as airborne transmission and extreme steam driven wheels. The result was the design of a family of triaxial chassis BAZ-5937, BAZ-5938 and BAZ-5939 rear engine, which became the basis of machines SAM Osa and BAZ-5921 as well as BAZ-5922 mid-engined, which was based missile system "Point".

From March 1971 by order of the Ministry of Defence KB plant began designing a new series of standardized four-chassis, which received the name "Base". As part of this development was created several models floating ground and chassis widespread. This series of pairwise grouping sets of axles, front pair - controllable.

Vehicles

Military

BAZ is known mainly for its military vehicles.

BAZ developed and manufactured platforms various Soviet and Russian SAM systems such as 9K33 Osa and S-400.

 BTR-152V1 (1958-1962) [2]
 ZIL-485A (1958-1962)
 BAZ-930
 ZIL-135LM (1964-1994)
 BAZ-135MB (1965-1996)
 six-wheel amphibious BAZ-5937 (1969-1990) and BAZ-5921 (1971-1990)
 "Base" / "Wax"
 amphibious four- BAZ-6944 (1979-1989) and their modifications non-amphibious BAZ-6948 (1986-1989)
 BAZ-6950, BAZ-69501, BAZ-69502 and BAZ-69506 (1976-1999)
 BAZ-6953
 BAZ-9А331М

Civil
Crane Chassis

 two axles BAZ-8027 - during a 32-ton crane
 three axles BAZ-8029 - for 25-ton crane truck crane plant Ivanovo
 four axles
 BAZ-6909.8 - under the 50-ton crane for handling dangerous goods
 five axle KSh-8973 - for 100-ton crane KS-8973

Tractor

 Road tractor BAZ-6403
 Pipe in the tractor BAZ-64031 with a trailer BAZ-9049
 Road tractor-terrain BAZ-64022

Special chassis

 Three axle BAZ-69095 - up to 14.7 tonnes
 Four axle BAZ-690902 - up to 22 tons
 Five axle BAZ-69096 - up to 33 tons
 Six axle BAZ-69099 - up to 40 tons

BAZ Civilian vehicles are used in the oil and construction industries in the mobile drilling installations and repairs as tanks, valves, pumps and cementing installation.

Gallery

References

External links
 Bryansky Avtomobilny Zavod official page
 

Truck manufacturers of Russia
Truck manufacturers of the Soviet Union
Defence companies of the Soviet Union
Almaz-Antey
Russian brands
1958 establishments in Russia
Vehicle manufacturing companies established in 1958
Companies based in Bryansk Oblast